This is a list of people who have served as Lord Lieutenant of Roxburghshire. The office was replaced by the Lord Lieutenant of Roxburgh, Ettrick and Lauderdale in 1975.

John Ker, 3rd Duke of Roxburghe 17 March 1794 – 19 March 1804
Henry Scott, 3rd Duke of Buccleuch 28 May 1804 – 11 January 1812
William Kerr, 6th Marquess of Lothian 25 January 1812 – 27 April 1824
John Kerr, 7th Marquess of Lothian 2 June 1824 – 14 November 1841
Walter Montagu Douglas Scott, 5th Duke of Buccleuch 30 November 1841 – 16 April 1884 
James Innes-Ker, 7th Duke of Roxburghe 17 May 1884 – 23 October 1892
Donald Mackay, 11th Lord Reay 14 November 1892 – 1918
Henry Innes-Ker, 8th Duke of Roxburghe 25 January 1918 – 29 September 1932
Walter Montagu Douglas Scott, 8th Duke of Buccleuch 3 November 1932 – 4 October 1973
John Scott, 9th Duke of Buccleuch 10 June 1974 – 1975
Buccleuch became Lord Lieutenant of Roxburgh, Ettrick and Lauderdale

References

Roxburghshire
 
Roxburgh